The uterine microbiome is the commensal, nonpathogenic, bacteria, viruses, yeasts/fungi present in a healthy uterus, amniotic fluid and endometrium and the specific environment which they inhabit. It has been only recently confirmed that the uterus and its tissues are not sterile. Due to improved 16S rRNA gene sequencing techniques, detection of bacteria that are present in low numbers is possible.
Using this procedure that allows the detection of bacteria that cannot be cultured outside the body, studies of microbiota present in the uterus are expected to increase.

Uterine microbiome and fertility
Evidence shows that the presence of uterine bacterial 16S rRNA  gene amplification is not the result of sampling or analysis error and deserves to be acknowledged. Concept of the sterile endometrium, and the uterine compartment in general, is outdated; although the true core uterine microbiome still needs to be assessed, and may vary across cultural and regional divides. Functional studies are needed to elucidate the physiological importance of the microbiome in fertility. The challenge of studying reproductive immunology and the microbiota involved is that research on all of the different aspects is still in its infancy; the microbiome, immunity, and endocrinology in pregnancy need to be studied both locally and temporally with placental and fetal development to obtain a more comprehensive overview.

Characteristics 

Bacteria, viruses and one genus of yeasts are a normal part of the uterus before and during pregnancy. The uterus has been found to possess its own characteristic microbiome that differs significantly from the vaginal microbiome, consisting primarily of lactobacillus species, and at far fewer numbers.In addition, the immune system is able to differentiate between those bacteria normally found in the uterus and those that are pathogenic. Hormonal changes have an effect on the microbiota of the uterus.

Taxa

Commensals 

The organisms listed below have been identified as commensals in the healthy uterus. Some also have the potential for growing to the point of causing disease:
{| class="wikitable sortable collapsible"
|-
! Organism 
! Commensal
! Transient 
! Potentialpathogen
! class=unsortable| References 
|-
|   Escherichia coli 
|align="center"|x 
|
|align="center"|x
| 
|-
|   Escherichia spp.
|   
|align="center"|x
|align="center"|x
| 
|-
|Ureaplasma parvum
|align="center"|x
|
|align="center"|x
|
|-
|Fusobacterium nucleatum
|align="center"|x
|
|
| 
|- 
| Prevotella tannerae
| align="center"|x
| align="center"|
| align="center"|
| 
|-
| Bacteroides spp.
| align="center"|x
| align="center"|
| align="center"|
| 
|-
| Streptomyces avermitilis
| align="center"|x
| align="center"|
| align="center"|
|               
|-
| Mycoplasma spp.
| align="center"|x
| align="center"|
| align="center"|x
|   
|-
| Neisseria lactamica
| align="center"|x
| align="center"|
| align="center"|
|  
|-
| Neisseria polysaccharea
| align="center"|x
| align="center"|
| align="center"|
|  
|-
| Epstein–Barr virus
| align="center"|x
| align="center"|
| align="center"|x
|  
|-
| Respiratory syncytial virus
| align="center"|x
| align="center"|
| align="center"|x
|   
|-
| Adenovirus
| align="center"|x
| align="center"|
| align="center"|x
|  
|-
| Candida spp.
| align="center"|x
| align="center"|
| align="center"|x
|                                 
|}

Pathogens
Other taxa can be present, without causing disease or an immune response. Their presence is associated with negative birth outcomes.

{| class="wikitable sortable collapsible"
|-
! Pathogenic organism 
! Increased risk of
! class=unsortable| References 
|-
|   Ureaplasma urealyticum 
|Premature, preterm rupture of membranesPreterm laborcesarean sectionPlacental inflammationCongenital pneumoniabacteremiameningitisfetal lung injurydeath of infant
|
|-
|   Haemophilus influenzae 
|Premature, preterm rupture of membranespreterm laborpreterm birth  
| 
|-
|Ureaplasma parvum
|
|
|-
|Fusobacterium nucleatum
| 
|
|- 
| Prevotella tannerae
| 
| 
|-
| Bacteroides spp.
| 
| 
|-
| Streptomyces avermitilis
| 
|            
|-
| Mycoplasma hominis 
|Congenital pneumoniabacteremiameningitis<pelvic inflammatory diseasepostpartum or postabortal fever
|   
|-
| Neisseria lactamica
| 
| 
|-
| Neisseria polysaccharea
|
| 
|-
| Epstein–Barr virus
| 
| 
|-
| Respiratory syncytial virus
| 
|  
|-
| Adenovirus
| 
|  
|-
| Candida spp.
| 
|                              
|}

Clinical significance 
Prophylactic antibiotics have been injected into the uterus to treat infertility. This has been done before the transfer of embryos with the intent to improve implantation rates. No association exists between successful implantation and antibiotic treatment. Infertility treatments often progress to the point where a microbiological analysis of the uterine microbiota is performed. Preterm birth is associated with certain species of bacteria that are not normally part of the healthy uterine microbiome.

Immune response 

The immune response becomes more pronounced when bacteria are found that are not commensal.

History
Investigations into reproductive-associated microbiomes began around 1885 by Theodor Escherich. He wrote that meconium from the newborn was free of bacteria. There was a general consensus at the time and even recently that the uterus was sterile and this was referred to as the sterile womb paradigm. Other investigations used sterile diapers for meconium collection. No bacteria were able to be cultured from the samples. Other studies showed that bacteria were detected and were directly proportional to the time between birth and the passage of meconium.

Research
Investigations into the role of the uterine microbiome in the development of the infant microbiome are ongoing.

See also 

 Human microbiome
 Human Microbiome Project
 Human virome
 List of antimicrobial peptides in the female reproductive tract
 List of bacterial vaginosis microbiota
 Placental microbiome
 Vaginal epithelium
 Vaginal flora in pregnancy

References and notes

Bacteriology
Bacteria
Uterus
Microbiology
Gynaecology
Microbiomes
Reproduction
Fertility
Women's health